Alresford railway station ( or ) in Hampshire, England, is the terminus of the Watercress Line from Alton. It is in the small town of New Alresford, 7½ miles (12 km) northeast of Winchester, close to the town's market square, tea rooms, many small shops and museum.

In official literature it is shown as Alresford (Hampshire) in order to distinguish it from the station of the same name in Essex.

History
In 1861, work started on the new Alton, Alresford and Winchester Railway which changed its name to the Mid-Hants Railway in 1865 with the line opening in the October of that year. The was bought by the London and South Western Railway in 1884, having operated it from the start. It was absorbed as part of that into the Southern Railway during the Grouping of 1923. The station then passed on to the Southern Region of British Railways upon nationalisation in 1948, and was then closed by the British Railways Board in February 1973.

Preservation

The station reopened on 30 April 1977 as the western terminus of the Watercress Line, a heritage railway. Alongside the station a goods shed was built which is now used as a shop, as well as meeting and tourist facilities for the railway. Adjacent to the station is a large warehouse which was built in 1873 as a mill, later used as a factory it is now used for offices and is Grade II listed. The buffet building is the old station building from Lyme Regis in Dorset, which was dismantled and rebuilt here.

It is unlikely that the line will ever be re-extended towards Winchester, because the M3 motorway and new houses have been built at various points along the former route.

Both platforms have been extended to hold four-coach trains plus the 'Cattle Dock' is used particularly during steam locomotive gala exhibitions as platform 1A, holding a two-coach train when not otherwise used.

References

Sources

 
 
 
 Station on navigable O.S. map

External links
Watercress Railway site

Heritage railway stations in Hampshire
Former London and South Western Railway stations
Railway stations in Great Britain opened in 1865
Railway stations in Great Britain closed in 1973
Beeching closures in England
Railway stations in Great Britain opened in 1977
1865 establishments in England
New Alresford